Sargah is a village in Sepidan County, Fars Province, Iran.

Sargah may also refer to:
 Sargah, Mohr or "Qaleh Sargah", Fars province